Pihtipudas is a municipality of Finland. There are all together 140 lakes in Pihtipudas. Biggest lakes are Alvajärvi, Muurasjärvi and Saanijärvi.

The municipality is unilingually Finnish.

Pihtipudas is known for the annual javelin carnival and Lauri "Tahko" Pihkala, the father of Finnish baseball. Putaanportti area offers plenty of services for travelers. Fish Art is a sales exhibition of taxidermic (mounted fish) – unique in Finland. Close to the service station there are shops – in a way factory outlets – specialized in sweets, leather bags and pottery products. Other tourist services are found in the central village and lakeside areas.

History 
Pihtipudas was first mentioned in 1552 as Pictipudhas, when it was a part of the large Rautalampi parish. Along with Kannonkoski, Kivijärvi and Konginkangas, it was transferred to the newly established Viitasaari parish in 1635. Pihtipudas gained a chapel in 1780 and a church in 1833, while in 1863 it became an independent parish.

Attractions
The scenery and history of Pihtipudas are easy to be found hand in hand on the bridge of Heinäjoki. Local museum and the church are next to each other in the center of Pihtipudas. Places worth mentioning are also Niemenharju area with well-known dancing place, an old demarcation Rillankivi and lake Alvajärvi area.

Twin towns
 Leirvík, Faroe Islands
 Borgarbyggð/Borgarnes, Iceland
 Ullensaker, Norway
 Dragsholm, Denmark
 Falkenberg, Sweden

Gallery

See also
 Eight Deadly Shots

References

External links

Municipality of Pihtipudas – Official website, finnish, english